is a Japanese footballer who last played for Nankatsu SC.

Club statistics
Updated to 1 March 2019.

References

External links
Profile at Shimizu S-Pulse

1987 births
Living people
Association football people from Yamanashi Prefecture
Japanese footballers
Japanese expatriate footballers
J1 League players
J2 League players
Kashiwa Reysol players
FC Gifu players
Avispa Fukuoka players
Montedio Yamagata players
Omiya Ardija players
Tokushima Vortis players
Shimizu S-Pulse players
V-Varen Nagasaki players
Sydney Olympic FC players
Association football forwards
Japanese expatriate sportspeople in Australia
Expatriate soccer players in Australia
Wollongong United FC players